Manoj Bhagawati was an Indian cricketer who played for Assam.

Bhagawati made a single first-class appearance, during the 1988-89 Ranji Trophy competition, against Orissa. Batting as an opener, Bhagawati scored 8 runs in the first innings and 10 runs in the second. He took one catch, and bowled one over in the match.

External links
Manoj Bhagawati at CricketArchive 

Indian cricketers
Assam cricketers
Living people
Year of birth missing (living people)